Raipur Domana is a census town in Jammu district in the Indian state of Jammu and Kashmir.It is a suburban area in the vicinity of Jammu city.

References

Cities and towns in Jammu district